The 2011 Women's Professional Soccer season is the third season for the WPS, the top level professional women's soccer league in the United States. The season started with the opening match on April 9, with the 2011 WPS Championship scheduled for the weekend of August 27–28.

Changes from the 2010 Season
Defending champions FC Gold Pride will not return for the 2011 season.
Also not returning for the 2011 season are Chicago Red Stars, which were given a month's deadline to find investors after the original announcement of the teams, but failed to achieve so.  The Red Stars will spend 2011 regrouping in the WPSL.
New to the league are the Western New York Flash, who are playing in Rochester, New York.
Due to a change in ownership, the Washington Freedom were renamed "magicJack", and also moved from the Washington area to Boca Raton in South Florida.

Competition Format/Schedule
The regular season will begin on April 9 and end on August 14, with most teams playing few games during the 2011 FIFA Women's World Cup.  The playoffs will be held during the last two weeks of August and end with the WPS Championship presented by Citi on either August 27 or 28.
Each team will play a total of eighteen games, two at home and two away against every other team minus one home game for one opponent and one away game for a different opponent.
The playoff format was identical to that of the 2010 season. The four teams with the most points from the regular season qualified for the playoffs. The third- and fourth-placed regular season finishers played each other in the single-match First Round, with the winner traveling to face the second-placed regular season finisher in the Super Semifinal midweek. The Super Semifinal winner then traveled to face the first-placed regular season finisher in the WPS Championship.

Standings

Playoffs

Awards

Player of the Week

Player of the Month

WPS Year End Awards

Source: 2011 WPS Year End Awards

2011 WPS Best XI

* – unanimous selection
Source: WPS Announces Best XI of 2011

Statistics

Scoring
First Goal of the season: Jordan Angeli for Boston Breakers against Atlanta Beat, 18th minute (April 9)
Earliest Goal in a match: 14 seconds by Lauren Cheney for Boston Breakers against Sky Blue FC (August 14) 
Widest Winning Margin: 6 goals
Philadelphia Independence 6-0 magicJack (June 18)
Most Goals Scored in a Match: 7
Philadelphia Independence 4-3 Sky Blue FC (July 6)
Fewest Scoreless Games: 1 - Western New York Flash
Most Scoreless Games: 13 - Atlanta Beat
Average Goals per Match: 2.778

Hat-tricks

 4 Player scored 4 goals
 5 Player scored 5 goals

Discipline
First Yellow Card: Katherine Reynolds for Atlanta Beat against Boston Breakers (April 9)
First Red Card: Allison Whitworth for Atlanta Beat against Boston Breakers (April 9)
Most Yellow Cards: 4
Carli Lloyd (Atlanta Beat)

Streaks
Longest Winning Streak: 6 games
Philadelphia Independence Games 8-13
Longest Unbeaten Streak: 8 games
Western New York Flash Games 1-8
Western New York Flash Games 11-18
Longest Winless Streak: 16 games
Atlanta Beat Games 3-18
Longest Losing Streak: 5 games
Atlanta Beat Games 4-8
Longest Shutouts:
Individual: 325 minutes by Valerie Henderson for Philadelphia Independence
Team:: 392 minutes for Philadelphia Independence
Longest Drought: 757 minutes for Atlanta Beat

Home Team Record
(Regular season only)
30 wins, 14 losses, 10 ties - 1.852 PPG
92 goals for, 58 against - +34 GD

References

External links
 Official Site
 women.soccerway.com; standings, results, fixtures, topscorers

 
2011
1